The Army of the Andes was a military force created by the United Provinces of the Río de la Plata (Argentina) and mustered by general José de San Martín in his campaign to free Chile from the Spanish Empire. In 1817, it crossed the Andes Mountains from the Argentine province of Cuyo (his staging point being the current-day province of Mendoza, Argentina), and succeeded in its objective by dislodging the Spanish from the country.

The exact number of the army varies between different sources; some have put the number as low as 3500, while others have it being as high as 6000 men. The army consisted of Argentines and Chileans, and included some 1200 auxiliaries to help in provisioning and supply, as well as a complement of artillery. The Congress of Tucumán endorsed San Martín's proposal to form an army to fight the royalists in Chile, and between August 1814 and February 1817, San Martín trained his troops to prepare them for their ordeal. While the army was made up of a less than experienced military force, San Martín intended to lead, with regular discipline and equipment, a proper army and not a "motley crew" into battle. 

For the crossing of the mountains, the Army was divided into two main columns, the first, commanded by Captain General San Martín and supported by Brigadier Major Miguel Estanislao Soler and Brigadier Bernardo O'Higgins, would take the Los Patos Pass and the second, commanded by Colonel Juan Gregorio de las Heras, would take the Uspallata Pass, which at its highest reaches some twelve thousand feet above sea level.  Because this second pass was more negotiable, the artillery was taken in the second column.     

These two divisions were the main body of the Army, but there were smaller detachments sent to the north and south as flanking wings.  The smaller division to the north was composed of some 130 infantry as well as a group of Chilean expatriates, and was under the command of Juan Manuel Cabot. To the south was a group under the command of the Chilean Ramón Freire Serrano.

After their 25-day journey across the Andes, the Army of the Andes successfully met royalist forces in the Battle of Chacabuco. After the victory, they entered Santiago de Chile, where San Martin was unanimously elected Supreme Director but by his own resolve, as well as from instructions received from Buenos Aires, the general declined. After his refusal, O'Higgins was finally elected. Under Argentine officers, the Chilean army resurrected and San Martín was designated commander of the "United Army", which was an army that combined the forces of the Army of the Andes and Chilean troops. This new army fought the counterattack of royalist Army of Osorio at battles of Cancha Rayada and Maipú.

Composition of the Army of the Andes

Black soldiers 
The number of black soldiers in the army of San Martin was numerous and comprised the majority of the 7th, 8th and 11th Infantry Regiments. According to San Martin's military doctrine, colored soldiers would serve better in the infantry branch, among the three arms of the Army of the Andes. Blacks represented two thirds of the soldiers in the Army of the Andes. They were estimated at between 2,000 and 3,000 Argentine freedmen who crossed the Andes to Chile in 1817 with San Martin's force. Black troops were mainly recruited from freed former slaves, which Lynch estimates at a figure of 1,554 freedmen. Most of them were recruited in the interior provinces rather than the city of Buenos Aires. Of those 2,500 black soldiers who took part in the Crossing of the Andes, only 143 survived and made it back to Argentina.

In all of these regiments, commissioned officers should have been white under the laws of the time. But San Martin sought to change the rules so that at least the black soldiers were promoted to corporals and sergeants. Traditionally, the Spanish colonial army battalions were divided into castes of black slaves and free blacks, but San Martin was against segregation and believed in unifying people of color and whites, fighting as soldiers in the same unit. Later both regiments 7th and 8th would be unified in Peru as the black regiment of the Río de la Plata. The 4th Infantry Battalion would also later be converted into an all-black unit.

Units (1814-1815)

Argentine Units

 Horse Grenadiers Regiment
 Cavalry Militia Regiment
 San Juan Militias Regiment
 Mendoza Militias Brigade
 La Rioja Militias Brigade
 Commander in Chief's Own Mounted Rifles Escorts Squadron
 San Luis Volunteer Cavalry Regiment
 Mendoza Volunteer Cavalry Regiment
 Mendoza Volunteer Artillery Batteries

Chilean Units

 1st Chilean Infantry Regiment
 Emigrant Battalion of Chilean Line Infantry
 Southern Patriotic Legion of Dragoons
 Chilean Battalion of Artillery

Combined Argentine-Chilean units
 Argentine Auxiliary Battalion

Units (1815-1817)
 3rd Battalion, Fatherland Regiment of Artillery
 8th Infantry Battalion
 11th Infantry Battalion
 1st Battalion, Andes Rangers and Sharpshooters
 7th Infantry Battalion
 4th Infantry Battalion
 Horse Grenadier Regiment
 Commander in Chief's Own Mounted Rifles Escort Squadron
 Río de la Plata Black Regiment (raised 1816)

See also
Battle of Chacabuco
Battle of Maipú
Chilean Independence
Crossing of the Andes

References

Citations

Bibliography

 

 

 

 

Military history of Chile
Military history of Argentina
José de San Martín
Military units and formations of Argentina